Gary Burns (born January 16, 1955) is an American former professional ice hockey forward. He played for the New York Rangers of the National Hockey League (NHL).

Early life 
Burns was born in Cambridge, Massachusetts, and raised in Arlington, Massachusetts. From 1974 to 1978, he played for the New Hampshire Wildcats at the University of New Hampshire.

Career 
Burns was drafted 191st overall by the Toronto Maple Leafs in the 1975 NHL Amateur Draft and 126th overall by the Cincinnati Stingers in the 1975 WHA Amateur Draft. He made his NHL debut with the New York Rangers during the 1980–81 NHL season, playing in eleven regular season games, scoring two goals and two assists, as well as in one playoff game. He also played in four playoff games for the Rangers the following season.

He won the 1983-84 CHL Championship (Adams Cup) as a member of the Tulsa Oilers team coached by Tom Webster.

References

External links

1955 births
Living people
American men's ice hockey forwards
Binghamton Dusters players
Cincinnati Stingers draft picks
Ice hockey players from Massachusetts
New Hampshire Wildcats men's ice hockey players
New Haven Nighthawks players
New York Rangers players
People from Arlington, Massachusetts
Rochester Americans players
Salt Lake Golden Eagles (IHL) players
Springfield Indians players
Sportspeople from Cambridge, Massachusetts
Sportspeople from Middlesex County, Massachusetts
Toronto Maple Leafs draft picks
Tulsa Oilers (1964–1984) players